The 1976 United States presidential election in Tennessee was held on November 2, 1976. The Democratic Party candidate, former Georgia governor Jimmy Carter won the state of Tennessee with 56% of the vote against Republican Party candidate, President Gerald Ford, carrying the state’s 10 electoral votes. This was the last time a Democratic presidential candidate won more than 50% of the vote in the Volunteer State, or carried the state by a double-digit margin.

Carter, a native Southerner from neighboring Georgia, carried Tennessee with a 13 point margin of victory against incumbent Ford. The Watergate scandal had severely damaged Ford's predecessor, Richard Nixon, who had resigned in 1974 as a result, and the Republican Party as a whole. The relatively unknown Carter campaigned as a Washington outsider free of the corruption of Watergate, and thus appealed to many voters in the country, including Tennessee.

As was normal during this era, Carter carried Western Tennessee and Middle Tennessee, the most Democratic regions in the state, by landslide margins, which included the major cities of Memphis and Nashville, the state capital. Carter even made inroads in traditionally Republican East Tennessee, though Ford kept the region in his column with his wins in the major cities of Chattanooga and Knoxville. Carter even outperformed by 0.44% Lyndon B. Johnson’s 1964 result during that President’s national landslide.

This was the first occasion since Oklahoma became a state in 1907 that Tennessee and Oklahoma produced a different popular vote winner, an occurrence replicated only in 1992 and 1996. , this is the last presidential election in which the Democratic candidate won Tennessee with a majority of the popular vote. Bill Clinton would carry the state in both his 1992 and 1996 presidential campaigns, though with pluralities, even with Tennessee native Al Gore on the tickets. This is also the last election in which Williamson County, Sullivan County, Madison County, Hamblen County, Cumberland County, McMinn County, Loudon County, Monroe County, Rhea County, and Chester County voted for a Democratic Presidential candidate.

Results

Results by county

References

1976 Tennessee elections
Tennessee
1976